Khalil Gibran School (KGS) is a Moroccan and British English International School in Rabat, Morocco founded in 1986 by Fouad Lyoubi. The school is named after Lebanese artist, poet, and writer Khalil Gibran. KGS caters to children from ages 4 to 18 years old (pre-school to 12th grade). The curriculum is a combination of Moroccan and British programs offering a fully tri-lingual, (Arabic, English, French) education designed to prepare students for the global challenges of the 21st century. KGS is licensed by Cambridge University International Examinations (CIE) in collaboration with the British Council. In 1999, KGS was the first school in the Kingdom to offer the British International General Certificate of Education qualifications (IGCSE). The school is situated in the Soussi suburb of Rabat.

Studies 
Students are prepared for Moroccan national examinations, and international examinations such as the Cambridge Primary Achievement Award, Cambridge Checkpoint, IGCSE (International General Certificate of Secondary Education), A Level and the CIE for schools qualifications (YLEs, KET, PET and FCE). Preparation classes for the American High School diploma are also available. English is the language of instruction for the international subjects. KGS is co-educational and non-residential.

Students 
The majority of students are from Morocco, however, 46 other nationalities currently study there, including:

Algerian
American
Austrian
Azerbaijani
Bangladeshi
Belgian
Brazilian
British
Bulgarian
Cameroonian
Canadian
Chinese
Dutch
Emirati
English
French
Gambian
German
Indian
Indonesian
Iraqi
Irish
Italian
Japanese
Jordanian
Korean
Kuwaiti
Lebanese
Libyan
Nigerian
Pakistani
Russian
Sultanate of Oman
Saudi Arabian
Spanish
Swiss
Yemeni

References

External links 

 Khalil Gibran School website
 Official CIE website

International schools in Rabat
Cambridge schools in Morocco
Educational institutions established in 1986
1986 establishments in Morocco
20th-century architecture in Morocco